Saint Eugendus (also Augendus; ;  449 – January 1, 510) was the fourth abbot of Condat Abbey, at Saint-Claude, Jura.  He was born at Izernore.

Life
He was instructed in reading and writing by his father, who had become a priest, and at the age of seven was given to Saint Romanus and Saint Lupicinus to be educated at Condat Abbey. Thenceforth he never left the monastery. Eugendus acquired much learning, read the Greek and Latin authors, and was well versed in the Scriptures. He led a life of great austerity, including being said to have never laughed, supposedly in respect to a passage in the Rule of St Benedict not to take pleasure in unrestrained or raucous laughter (despite the fact that St. Benedict was born thirty years after him and would scarcely have been known at the time of Eugendus' death). He also refused ever to be ordained a priest. 

Abbot Minausius made him his coadjutor, and after the former's death (about 496) Eugendus became his successor.  After the monastery, which Saint Romanus had built of wood, was destroyed by fire, Eugendus erected another of stone, and improved the community life; thus far the brethren had lived in separate cells after the fashion of the Eastern ascetics. He built an abbey church in honour of the holy Apostles Peter, Paul, and Andrew, and enriched it with precious relics; the church was the predecessor of the rebuilt abbey church that is now Saint-Claude Cathedral

The order, which had been founded on the rules of the Oriental monasteries, now took on more of the active character of the Western brethren; the rule of Tarnate is thought to have served as a model. Condat began to flourish as a place of refuge for all those who suffered from the misfortunes and afflictions of those eventful times, a school of virtue and knowledge amid the surrounding darkness, an oasis in the desert. When Eugendus felt his end approaching he had his breast anointed by a priest, took leave of his brethren, and died quietly after five days, at the age of sixty-one.

Veneration
A few years after his death, his successor, Saint Viventiolus, erected a shrine over his tomb in the abbey church, to which numerous pilgrims travelled. The village that grew round Condat Abbey came to be called, after the saint, Saint-Oyand de Joux, a name it retained as late as the sixteenth and seventeenth centuries, while the abbey's former name of Condat passed into oblivion; the abbey was secularised in 1742.

Eugendus has a biography in the Vita patrum Jurensium.

The feast of Saint Eugendus was at first transferred to 2 January; in the dioceses of Besançon and Saint-Claude it is now celebrated on 4 January.

Notes

References
Burns, Paul. Butler's Lives of the Saints: New Full Edition.  Collegeville, MN:The Liturgical Press, 1995. .

Attribution

510 deaths
6th-century Christian saints
Gallo-Roman saints
Year of birth unknown